B League may refer to

B.League, the Japanese basketball league

Bangladesh Premier League (football)